Abbey Mills or Abbey Mill may refer to:

 Abbey Mill, Reading, a ruined former watermill in Reading, Berkshire
 Abbey Mill, West Ham, an ancient tidal watermill in London
 Abbey Mills Pumping Stations in Abbey Lane, London
 Abbey Mills Mosque, a proposed mosque that was to have been built in London
 Merton Abbey Mills, a former textile factory in London